Concorde Hills is a census-designated place (CDP) in Sycamore Township, Hamilton County, Ohio, United States. The population was 644 at the 2020 census.

Geography
It is bordered by The Village of Indian Hill to the east and the city of Madeira to the south.

References

Census-designated places in Hamilton County, Ohio
Census-designated places in Ohio